The World Indoor Bowls Championship is an international bowls competition held annual at Potters holiday park in Hopton on Sea.

The last week of the competition is televised live on BBC where the open singles and open pairs', women's singles and mixed pairs' finals are shown.

History
The competition was first held in 1979 in  Coatbridge, Scotland as a men's singles only event. The first event was sponsored by Embassy Cigarettes. 

In 1986, the men's pairs competition was added to the championship. In 1988, a rule change allowed women to compete for the first time and the women's singles competition was created. This rule change also changed expanded the men's singles and pairs competition and both become  open tournaments.

In 1989, the championships moved to the Guild Hall in  Preston, England And Churchill Insurance took over the sponsorship. While the competition was being held in Preston,  Midland Bank and SAGA were also sponsors at various times.

In 1999, Potters Holidays took over the sponsorship and, as part of the agreement, the event moved to its current home at the company's resort in Hopton-on-Sea. The mixed pairs competition was added to the championship in 2004.

World Indoor Men's/Open Singles Champions

Wins by individual (Open Singles only)

Performance by country (Open singles only)

World Indoor Women's Singles Champions

World Indoor Men's/Open Pairs Champions
The Men's Pairs (now Open Pairs) allows women to compete, this is not to be confused with the Mixed Pairs. It was a men's only competition until 2012.

World Indoor Mixed Pairs Champions

World Indoor Open Under 25 Champions

Players with 5 or more titles

See also
World Bowls Events
World Bowls Tour Events

References

External links
World Bowls Page, Potters Resort Website
 

 
Recurring sporting events established in 1979
Indoor
Indoor sports competitions
World Bowls Tour